Sodium bisulfate, also known as sodium hydrogen sulfate, is the sodium salt of the bisulfate anion, with the molecular formula NaHSO4. Sodium bisulfate is an acid salt formed by partial neutralization of sulfuric acid by an equivalent of sodium base, typically in the form of either sodium hydroxide (lye) or sodium chloride (table salt). It is a dry granular product that can be safely shipped and stored. The anhydrous form is hygroscopic. Solutions of sodium bisulfate are acidic, with a 1M solution having a pH of around 1.

Production
Sodium bisulfate is produced as an intermediate in the Mannheim process, an industrial process involving the reaction of sodium chloride and sulfuric acid:
NaCl  +  H2SO4   →  HCl  +  NaHSO4
The process for the formation of sodium bisulfate is highly exothermic. The liquid sodium bisulfate is sprayed and cooled so that it forms a solid bead. The hydrogen chloride gas is dissolved in water to produce hydrochloric acid as a useful coproduct of the reaction.

Although not of commercial interest, sodium bisulfate can be generated as a byproduct of the production of many other mineral acids via the reaction of their sodium salts with an excess of sulfuric acid:
NaX + H2SO4 → NaHSO4 +  HX ( X− = CN−, NO3−, ClO4−)
The acids HX produced have a lower boiling point than the reactants and are separated from the reaction mixture by distillation.

Chemical reactions
Once cooled again, it is freshly hygroscopic. Heating sodium bisulfate to  produces sodium pyrosulfate, another colorless salt:
2 NaHSO4   →  Na2S2O7 +  H2O

Uses
Sodium bisulfate is used primarily to lower pH. it also is used in metal finishing, cleaning products, and to lower the pH of water for effective chlorination in swimming pools and hot tubs. Sodium bisulfate is also AAFCO approved as a general-use feed additive, including use in poultry feed  and companion animal food. It is used as a urine acidifier to reduce urinary stones in cats.

It is highly toxic to certain echinoderms, but fairly harmless to most other life forms; so it is used in controlling outbreaks of crown-of-thorns starfish.

Sodium bisulfate was the primary active ingredient in the toilet bowl cleaners Vanish and Sani-Flush, both now discontinued.

In the textiles industry, it is sometimes applied to velvet cloth made with a silk backing and a pile of cellulose-based fiber (rayon, cotton, hemp, etc.) to create "burnout velvet": the sodium bisulfate, when applied to such a fabric and heated, causes the cellulose-based fibers to become brittle and flake away, leaving burned-out areas in the finished material, usually in attractive patterns.

Sodium bisulfate is the active ingredient in some granular poultry litter treatments used to control ammonia.  Sodium bisulfate has also been shown to significantly reduce the concentration of Campylobacter and Salmonella in chicken houses.

Sodium Bisulfate is sometimes used as the active ingredient in flocculant tablets, a step in soil and water quality test kits.

In food
Sodium bisulfate is used as a food additive to leaven cake mixes (make them rise) as well as being used in meat and poultry processing and most recently in browning prevention of fresh-cut produce. Sodium bisulfate is considered generally recognized as safe (GRAS) by the FDA and has been named to the EPA Safer Choice Safer Chemicals Ingredients List. The food-grade product also meets the requirements set out in the Food Chemicals Codex. It is denoted by E number E514ii in the EU and is also approved for use in Australia, New Zealand, Canada, and Mexico. where it is listed as additive 514. Food grade sodium bisulfate is used in a variety of food products, including beverages, dressings, sauces, and fillings. It has many synonyms including bisulfate of soda, sodium acid sulfate, mono sodium hydrogen sulfate, sodium hydrogen sulfate, sodium hydrosulfate, and sulfuric acid sodium salt (1:1).

Sodium bisulfate is considered natural by the Grocery Manufacturers Association (GMA) since it is made from minerals. However, all commercially available sodium bisulfate is produced from sulfuric acid synthesized from elemental sulfur via the contact process.

Sodium bisulfate lowers the pH without creating a sour taste, and has been used in the place of citric, malic, or phosphoric acids that are commercially available, and it can also be used as an anti-browning agent.

Notes

References

External links 
Food Chemicals Codex

Sulfates
Sodium compounds
Acid salts
Photographic chemicals
Cleaning products
Food additives